Kagiso or Kagisho is a Tswana  given name. It means "peace" In the English language.  Some people called Kagiso include
Kagisho Dikgacoi (born 1984), South African footballer 
Kagiso Kilego (born 1983), Botswana sprinter 
Kagiso Lediga, South African stand-up comedian, actor and director
Kagiso Mohale (born 1994), South African first-class cricketer
Kagiso Rabada (born 1995), South African cricketer
Kagiso Rapulana (born 1991), South African first-class cricketer
Kagiso Tshelametsi (born 1980), Botswana football goalkeeper